Elliotherium is an extinct genus of cynodonts which existed in South Africa during the upper Triassic period. The type species is Elliotherium kersteni, named after the Elliot Formation in which the fossils were found.

References 

Tritheledontidae
Prehistoric cynodont genera
Triassic synapsids of Africa
Triassic South Africa
Fossils of South Africa
Fossil taxa described in 2006
Taxa named by Christian Sidor